Robert Joseph LaFromboise (born June 25, 1986) is an American former professional baseball pitcher. He has played in Major League Baseball (MLB) for the Seattle Mariners and Pittsburgh Pirates. He was a Southern League All-Star in 2011 and 2012.

Career
LaFromboise attended Warren High School in Downey, California, Rio Hondo College in Whittier, California, and the University of New Mexico. In 2008, he led the team with 63 strikeouts in 81.1 innings pitched, along with tossing two complete games.

Seattle Mariners
The Seattle Mariners selected LaFromboise in the eighth round of the 2008 MLB Draft. They promoted him to the major leagues for the first time on April 10, 2013.

San Diego Padres
LaFromboise was claimed off waivers by the San Diego Padres on April 2, 2014, and optioned to the Triple-A El Paso Chihuahuas. He was recalled on April 9 for a doubleheader against the Cleveland Indians, as the Padres' 26th man, but did not appear in either game and was returned to Triple-A immediately thereafter. LaFromboise was designated for assignment on August 20, 2014.

Pittsburgh Pirates
The Pittsburgh Pirates claimed LaFromboise on August 24, and optioned him to AAA. On September 2, 2014, LaFromboise was called up to the majors. He made his first postseason appearance for the Pirates, pitching in the 2014 National League Wild Card Game.

Los Angeles Angels
On December 23, 2015, LaFromboise was claimed off waivers by the Angels. He was designated for assignment by the Angels on January 25.

Philadelphia Phillies
He was claimed off waivers by the Philadelphia Phillies on January 29, and designated for assignment on February 10. He was released on June 3, 2016.

Texas Rangers
On February 13, 2017, Lafromboise signed a minor league contract with the Texas Rangers. He was released on August 14, 2017.

References

External links

1986 births
Living people
Baseball players from California
Sportspeople from Downey, California
Major League Baseball pitchers
Seattle Mariners players
Pittsburgh Pirates players
New Mexico Lobos baseball players
Everett AquaSox players
Clinton LumberKings players
High Desert Mavericks players
Jackson Generals (Southern League) players
Tacoma Rainiers players
El Paso Chihuahuas players
Indianapolis Indians players
Peoria Javelinas players
Rio Hondo Roadrunners baseball players